Tyler Bertuzzi (born February 24, 1995) is a Canadian professional ice hockey forward for the  Boston Bruins of the National Hockey League (NHL). Bertuzzi was drafted 58th overall by the Detroit Red Wings in the 2013 NHL Entry Draft.

Playing career

Junior
Bertuzzi was drafted 78th overall in the 2011 OHL Entry Draft by the Guelph Storm.

During the 2011–12 season, Bertuzzi played in 61 games for Guelph in his first full year in the OHL. Making his OHL debut on September 22, 2011, he recorded a fight. Bertuzzi finished with six goals, 11 assists, and 117 penalty minutes. Bertuzzi played in all six of Guelph's playoff games, finishing the series with two assists.

During the 2012–13 season, Bertuzzi had 13 goals and had nine assists in 43 games. Bertuzzi played in all five playoff games with Guelph, finishing with no points and 14 penalty minutes. At the conclusion of the season, Bertuzzi was selected in the second round, 58th overall by the Detroit Red Wings during the 2013 NHL Entry Draft.

During the 2013–14 season, Bertuzzi only played in 29 games, finishing the season with 10 goals and 25 assists, helping the Storm capture the OHL Championship and advance to the Memorial Cup championship game. Bertuzzi led the Memorial Cup with five goals in four games. Guelph played 18 playoff games, with Bertuzzi playing in all, scoring 10 goals, seven assists, and a +24 rating.

During the 2014–15 season, Bertuzzi had his best season of his career, leading Guelph Storm in scoring with 98 points while playing in all of the team's 68 games. Bertuzzi also led Guelph in goals (43), assists (55), penalty minutes (91), and plus/minus +26. Through nine games in the playoffs, Bertuzzi tied the team in scoring with eight points. Bertuzzi was named an OHL all-star, finishing the season ranked tenth in OHL scoring.

Professional

Detroit Red Wings (2014–2023)
On October 17, 2014, the Red Wings signed Bertuzzi to a three-year entry-level contract.

After finishing his season with Guelph Storm, Bertuzzi played two regular season games of the 2014–15 season. He made his professional debut for the Grand Rapids Griffins on April 16, 2015, in a game against the Lake Erie Monsters. In his second AHL game, also against the Lake Erie Monsters, he scored his first professional goal against Calvin Pickard.

On November 7, 2016, Bertuzzi was recalled by the Detroit Red Wings, and made his NHL debut the next day in a game against the Philadelphia Flyers. Prior to being recalled Bertuzzi recorded two goals and two assists in nine games for the Griffins. On November 15, Bertuzzi was assigned to Grands Rapids. Bertuzzi appeared in three games for the Red Wings, logging five hits and two shots on goal in 9:57 average time on ice. Bertuzzi was again recalled by the Red Wings on November 17. During the 2016–17 season, Bertuzzi recorded 12 goals and 25 assists in 48 games during the regular season. During the 2017 Calder Cup playoffs, he recorded nine goals and 10 assists in 19 games, to help lead the Griffins to the Calder Cup, and was awarded the Jack A. Butterfield Trophy as the Most Valuable Player. He set the Griffins' franchise record with 23 career playoff goals.

On December 21, 2017 Bertuzzi was recalled by the Red Wings. Prior to being recalled he recorded seven goals and seven assists in 16 games for the Griffins. Bertuzzi recorded his first career NHL goal against Jeff Glass of the Chicago Blackhawks on January 14, 2018. During the 2017–18 season he recorded seven goals and 17 assists in 48 games for the Red Wings.

On June 25, 2018, the Red Wings signed Bertuzzi to a two-year contract extension. On January 12, 2019, Bertuzzi recorded his first career hat-trick against Devan Dubnyk of the Minnesota Wild. Bertuzzi was named the NHL Second Star of the week, for the week ending April 1. He shared the league lead with three goals and seven assists in four games. He registered three straight three-point performances, posting two goals and one assist, including his first career overtime goal, in a 5–4 victory over the Buffalo Sabres on March 28, one goal and two assists in a 4–0 victory over the New Jersey Devils on March 29 and three assists in a 6–3 victory over the Boston Bruins on March 31. Bertuzzi became the first Detroit player to record three consecutive three-point games since Steve Yzerman in 1992–93. On April 2, Bertuzzi recorded two goals and one assist in a 4–1 victory over the Pittsburgh Penguins. He became the first player in Red Wings franchise history to record four consecutive three-point games.

On October 28, 2020, the Red Wings signed Bertuzzi to a one-year, $3.5 million contract. In the pandemic delayed 2020–21 season, Bertuzzi appeared in just nine regular season games, collecting seven points, before he was ruled out for the remainder of the season due to a back injury. It was announced that he underwent back surgery on April 30, 2021. On July 31, 2021, the Red Wings signed Bertuzzi to a two-year contract extension. During the 2022–23 season, Bertuzzi, was limited to 29 games due to injury, and recorded four goals and 10 assists in 16:29 average time on ice.

Boston Bruins (2023–present)
On March 2, 2023, Bertuzzi was traded to the Boston Bruins in exchange for a conditional first-round pick in the 2024 NHL Entry Draft and a fourth-round pick in the 2025 NHL Entry Draft.

International play

On April 29, 2019, Bertuzzi was selected to make his international debut after he was named to the Team Canada roster for the 2019 IIHF World Championship, held in Slovakia. He helped Canada progress through to the playoff rounds before losing the final to Finland to finish with the Silver Medal on May 26, 2019. Bertuzzi finished the tournament going scoreless through 5 games.

Personal life
Bertuzzi is the son of Angela Bertuzzi, an educational assistant, He has two brothers: Evan and Matthew Gedye. His cousins, Tag and Jaden Bertuzzi, also play hockey. Tag was selected second overall by Guelph Storm in the 2017 OHL draft.

Bertuzzi is the nephew of former NHL player Todd Bertuzzi. In September 2021, it came out that Bertuzzi was not vaccinated against COVID-19. As a result, he wasn't allowed to cross the border to play in Canada and had to surrender more than $450,000 of his $4.75 million salary. He is reportedly the only NHL player not vaccinated as of December 2021.

Career statistics

Regular season and playoffs

International

Awards and honours

References

External links
 

1995 births
Living people
Boston Bruins players
Canadian ice hockey forwards
Canadian sportspeople of Italian descent
Detroit Red Wings draft picks
Detroit Red Wings players
Grand Rapids Griffins players
Guelph Storm players
Ice hockey people from Ontario
Sportspeople from Greater Sudbury